The Last Star is a young adult science fiction novel written by American author Rick Yancey. It was published on May 24, 2016, by G. P. Putnam's Sons. The novel is the third and final in The 5th Wave trilogy, preceded by The Infinite Sea.

The Last Star concludes the story of 16-year-old Cassiopeia "Cassie" Sullivan, battling against the aliens that have invaded Earth. Unlike the first two books, the book received mixed-to-negative reviews from critics, who criticized the ending.

Summary

The story opens with a flashback of Cassie Sullivan's dad, when he was a kid on a school field trip to a planetarium. Amazed by a starry spectacle the administrators displayed, he decides then and there to name a future daughter after Cassiopeia.

In the present, the remaining human population tries to avoid run ins with the "Others", the aliens that have wiped out most of humanity. A band of survivors hides in caves near Urbana, Ohio. One of them, a priest, turns out to be a Silencer, a human physically enhanced by an implanted neural chip (part of the Other's "12th System") that also makes them believe they are Others. After killing the humans, the Silencer sits back to wait for the day the alien mothership drops the Final Wave, the green bombs that will complete the destruction of humanity and complete the Others' plans for Earth.

Human teenager Ringer, enhanced with the 12th System by Vosch, the human-appearing leader of the Others, has spent 40 days in the wilderness testing out her enhancements. She returns to Vosch because she knows they have a mutual goal that he will help her kill Evan Walker, a Silencer who has started to help the humans after falling in love with Cassie. Vosch gives Ringer a bomb contained in a pill that can destroy everything in a five-mile radius, so that she can kill herself instead of being killed by the Final Wave when the time comes. He then dispatches Ringer and a Silencer named Constance to look for Evan in the caverns.

Cassie, her younger brother Sam (called Nugget), her former high school crush Ben Parish (now using the name Zombie) and other young humans from Squad 53 are hiding at a safe house. The squads were teams of young humans who were "weaponized" into the 5th Wave, tricked into attacking other human survivors by being told that those humans are actually Others in human disguise. Cassie is surprised one day by the arrival of Evan. She screams at him about how cruel the Others' takeover has been, and the fact that Sam is forgetting his life before the invasion started, losing his traits of humanity. Later, she is furious with Zombie when he announces that he and Dumbo are going to the caverns to find Teacup and Ringer (unbeknownst of Ringer's transformation and the fact that Teacup is dead), so he can warn them about the upcoming final Wave.

While in the woods, an attack ends with Dumbo shot in the back. Zombie stuffs rags into Dumbo's wound, hides him in a building in Urbana, and goes for help. Later Zombie finds an old cat lady who reminds him of his grandmother. She offers him some soup, then reveals that the secret ingredient is cat, then she tries to strangle Zombie. He has no choice but to shoot her dead.

Ringer and Constance land near the caverns. Constance disappears and Ringer battles the Silencer priest, whose 12 System power is faster and stronger. At that point, Zombie also arrives at the caves, still looking for Ringer and Teacup. He falls into a large pit full of dead bodies and starts to sink, when Constance pulls him out and shoots the priest dead.

Zombie, Ringer and Constance head into Urbana to reunite with Dumbo. Zombie is suspicious of Constance, but Ringer vouches for her, knowing that if she doesn't Constance will kill her friends. They return to Dumbo's hiding place, but Ringer notes that he has lost too much blood. Dumbo dies, and Zombie marks his grave with colored flags.

The three of them return to the safe house where Evan, Cassie, Nugget and Megan (a young child they previously rescued) are waiting. When the trio arrive, Constance grabs Nugget and puts a gun to his head, demanding that Evan be given to her so she can bring him back to Vosch. Nugget, using a gun hidden in his pants, shoots Constance. Her enhancements help her survive, so Ringer and Nugget shoot her repeatedly to finish her off. Ringer tells them that Vosch will see that Constance's implant is offline and send a helicopter and a squad of 5th Wave troops to capture Evan and kill everyone else. Evan volunteers to return to Vosch in order to save everyone else.

As the chopper approaches, everyone hides in the basement of the safe house. Ringer and Evan kill many of the attacking soldiers, revealed to be Ringer's original squad before she was transferred to Squad 53. Evan is captured and taken away in the helicopter. Ringer devises a plan for those in the safe house to attack the soldiers that will come to bring back the survivors from the first chopper. During this planning and waiting, Ringer tells Zombie that she is pregnant with Razor's baby - a 5th Wave soldier who helped Ringer escape from Vosch at the end of the previous book. When the next chopper arrives, they kill all the soldiers, capture the helicopter pilot, Major Bob, and leave a wounded Zombie behind to take Nugget and Megan to the caves. Ringer forces Major Bob to fly them to Vosch's base.

Evan has already arrived at the base, where Vosch finally explains the aliens' actions. They manipulate, commit genocide, and suppress the development of other sentient species to further their own radical deep ecologist goals. He tells Evan that there are only 12 true Others on Earth like Vosch that know the entirety of their plans: the Others have gone to many planets and attacked dominant species in order to save the lives of all other species before the dominant ones can destroy themselves and their planet's ecosystems. He says that the next day, the mothership will bomb every city on Earth to destroy all footprints of mankind. This will remove all traces of art, music, knowledge, and civilization. As a result, the remainder of humanity will fight amongst themselves, without ever having access to their past knowledge. Humans will never be able to rise to civilization again and forever stay in the stone age, thus keeping the balance of life on earth. When this Final Wave succeeds, Vosch's reward will be a launch in an escape pod to the mothership to become an immortal consciousness.

Vosch knows that his 12th System creation, Ringer, will come back to kill him, so he must have her killed. He examines Evan and discovers that the glitch in the 12th System is love – in Evan's case, he fell in love with Cassie. He has Evan reprogrammed to have all of his humanity erased from his mind, leaving him as an emotionless killing machine. He knows Ringer will come and plans to have Evan kill her.

At the caves, a helicopter searches for the escapees from the safe house. Zombie, Nugget, and Megan are soon in a heated battle with the attacking squad. Zombie is helping Megan and Nugget escape when he is suddenly shot in the back of the head, and everything goes white.

Ringer and Cassie begin their infiltration of the base. Upon landing, Cassie (now dressed in a soldier uniform) runs one way as Ringer runs another. Ringer detonates a bomb and, in the confusion, Cassie is able to hide among the troops. Cassie and Ringer plan to make it to the command center from opposite directions, with Ringer setting off additional bombs to cause chaos. Cassie continuously hears an alarm warning that General Order Four will commence in five minutes and all forces are to head to designated safe areas. Cassie makes it to the door where she is to wait for Ringer, when General Order Four activates. All the lights in the base go dark, the sprinkler system goes off, starting to flood the room, and her skin begins to burn – a small version of the first three waves (blackouts, floods, pestilence) the Others used when they attacked Earth. She shoots out a window and leaps outside, rolling in the dirt to try and get the poison off her skin.

At the Urbana caves, Zombie comes to. A female Sergeant shows him a picture of Ringer and asks where she is. He plays dumb until she places a gun to Nugget's head, then he admits that Ringer went to the base to kill Vosch. Her troops want to kill Nugget, Zombie and Megan, but the Sergeant says their orders were to capture them, so they load them on the helicopter and head back to the base.

When Ringer spots Cassie rolling on the ground, she jumps 40 feet across a roof and then jumps three stories down to help Cassie. Ringer removes all of Cassie's clothes and swaps outfits with her, knowing that her 12th System enhancements will protect her from the poison. The pair descend into the base in search of Evan and Vosch. They enter the computer core and try to find Evan's data, so they can find out where he is. Since all the people's data/memories are labeled by number, Cassie decides to download all 10,000 people's worth of memories into her mind. Ringer hears movement in the hallway and leaves Cassie strapped into the download chair. Meanwhile, Cassie now knows everything about Ringer, Evan, Zombie, Nugget, and every other human loaded in the database. She also learns all of the access codes and the layout of the base.

Ringer finds Evan in the hall, and they fight. Because Evan is now purely 12th System, he is much faster, stronger, and more ruthless than Ringer. She shoots him repeatedly, to little effect. When Evan breaks her back, she knows the 12th System won't repair her quickly enough, so Ringer screams to Cassie to run. When Evan enters the room, he only finds bits of Cassie's hair and blood in the chair, as she has torn herself out. As he uses his super hearing to find her, entering a flooded room, where Cassie drops a live electrical wire into the water, electrocuting him.

Vosch finds Ringer, still paralyzed. He explains that he thinks of himself as Ringer's creator/father, and wants to take her with him to the mothership. She turns him down, distracting him until Cassie appears and shoots him in the head. Cassie emotionlessly tells Ringer that she killed Evan, and Ringer consoles her, stating that he was already gone, having been turned into a shell of a person without humanity.

Cassie, with her downloaded knowledge, uses a keypad to open a secret door to Vosch's escape pod. Cassie leaves in the pod and Ringer searches her pockets for the explosive pill Vosch gave, so she can wipe out the base. She remembers that she switched outfits with Cassie, so Ringer drags herself to Vosch's body and searches his pockets for the kill-switch that will kill all 5,000 soldiers at the base who have tracker implants.

Zombie, Nugget and Megan are in the helicopter, which has been circling the base waiting for General Order Four to be turned off. The pilot and soldiers suddenly stiffen and die. Zombie realizes Ringer or Cassie must still be alive and activated the kill-switch. The trio survive the helicopter crashing by jumping into a river. As they head to the base, they see a green light launch and head towards the mothership.

Cassie finds the explosive pill in her pocket and recognizes its similar to the one Megan had, which is activated by the carbon dioxide in a person's exhaled breath. The escape pod docks on the giant mothership, the size of Manhattan, and sees that it is filled with the high explosives that are to be dropped on Earth's cities. She recites her and Sammy's night-time prayers one last time before sacrificing herself to destroy the ship. Zombie witnesses a large explosion from the mothership which then disappears. He finds Ringer paralyzed in the hallway and realizes that Cassie has sacrificed herself.

Several months later, Zombie and Nugget are in a toy store in Texas. They come across a soldier with one hand in his shirt holding a wound—similar to a scenario Cassie experienced in the first book. Nugget wants to kill the soldier and Zombie tells him that they don't do that anymore. Zombie tries to reason with the soldier, but the soldier pulls a gun and shoots himself in the head. Zombie and Nugget return to a house where Ringer is nursing her newborn baby girl, she named Cassie. Outside, Evan Walker is patrolling – the 12th System saved him from the electrocution, and his human friends have re-downloaded his memories, returning his humanity. Evan tells Zombie that he plans to go to as many 5th Wave military bases as he can and destroy them, calculating that for every life he takes, two will be saved. As Evan leaves, Nugget watches from the house. He asks Zombie about the constellation that was his sister's namesake, and Zombie points out that three of the stars are a throne that the constellation Cassiopeia sits on, from which Cassie now sits to watch over the realm.

References

External links 

 

2016 science fiction novels
2016 American novels
American science fiction novels
American young adult novels
G. P. Putnam's Sons books
Novels about extraterrestrial life
The 5th Wave